The 2018 Top Challenge League was the second season of Japan's second-tier domestic rugby union competition, the Top Challenge League.

It was played from 8 September to 9 December 2018, with eight participating teams. NTT DoCoMo Red Hurricanes won the competition for the third time – having previously won in 2010–11 and 2016–17 and qualified for the promotion play-offs, along with Mitsubishi Sagamihara DynaBoars, Kintetsu Liners and Kurita Water Gush. Kamaishi Seawaves and Chugoku Red Regulions finished seventh and eighth respectively to qualify for the relegation play-offs.

Competition rules

In January 2017, the JRFU announced the format of the Top Challenge League competition. The competition was played in two stages. The First Stage was a round-robin format, where all eight teams played each other once.

The top four teams in the First Stage progressed to Group A of the Second Stage, while the bottom four teams progressed to Group B. Each of these groups was another round-robin, with all four teams playing each other once.

The four teams that competed in Group A progressed to promotion play-offs against the bottom four teams in the 2018–19 Top League.

The two team that finished bottom and second-bottom of Group B progressed to the relegation play-offs, along with the winners and the runners-up of the Regional Challenge, held between the champions of the Top East League, Top West League and Top Kyūshū League.

Teams

The following teams took part in the 2018 Top Challenge League competition:

First stage

Standings

The current standings for the 2018 Top Challenge League First Stage are:

Matches

The 2018 Top Challenge League First Stage fixtures are:

Round one

Round two

Round three

Round four

Round five

Round six

Round seven

Second Stage Group A

Standings

The standings for the 2018 Top Challenge League Second Stage Group A are:

 Kintetsu Liners, Kurita Water Gush, Mitsubishi Sagamihara DynaBoars and NTT DoCoMo Red Hurricanes qualified for the promotion play-offs.

Matches

Round one

Round two

Round three

Second Stage Group B

Standings

The standings for the 2018 Top Challenge League Second Stage Group B are:

 Kyuden Voltex and Mazda Blue Zoomers remain in the Top Challenge League for 2019.
 Chugoku Red Regulions and Kamaishi Seawaves qualify for the relegation play-offs.

Matches

Round one

Round two

Round three

Relegation play-offs 

 Top Challenge League side Kamaishi Seawaves won their match to remain in the Top Challenge League for 2019.
 Top Challenge League side Chugoku Red Regulions lost their match and was relegated to the Top Kyūshū League for 2019.
 Top League East side Shimizu Blue Sharks won their match to win promotion to the Top Challenge League for 2019.
 Top League West side Chubu Electric Power lost their match to remain in the Top League West for 2019.

The matches played were:

See also

 2018–19 Top League

References

2018
2018–19 in Japanese rugby union
2018–19 rugby union tournaments for clubs